Used Future is the sixth and final studio album by American heavy metal band the Sword. Recorded in late 2017 at Flora Recording & Playback in Portland, Oregon, it was produced by Tucker Martine and was released on March 23, 2018, by Razor & Tie.

Recording and production
The Sword began recording the follow-up to 2015's High Country in October 2017, working with producer Tucker Martine at his studio Flora Recording & Playback in Portland, Oregon. Recording was completed in November, with the album's title revealed during the original press release in October.

Promotion and release
Used Future was officially announced for release on March 23, 2018, on January 26, when the lead single "Deadly Nightshade" was also released as a digital download.

Track listing

Personnel
John D. Cronise – vocals, rhythm guitar
Kyle Shutt – lead guitar
Bryan Richie – bass, keyboards
Santiago "Jimmy" Vela III – drums
Tucker Martine – production

Charts

References

2018 albums
The Sword albums
Razor & Tie albums
Albums produced by Tucker Martine